La Paloma Theatre is a historic Spanish Colonial Revival style movie theater in Encinitas, California.

History 
It was constructed in 1927-28 by Frank E. Brown and was originally a silent movie theater with 540 seats. It had an orchestra section and small balcony sections. The architect was Edward J. Baum.  

The La Paloma Theater formally opened on February 11, 1928,  with a showing of "The Cohens and Kelleys in Paris." The opening event for the movie was attended by actress Mary Pickford. Charlie Chaplin also performed at the theater.

It was one of the first theaters to show "talkies" as the talking pictures first premiered in 1927. In 1928 they installed sound equipment for talking movies, which had only originated in 1927.

The theater includes handmade and painted floor tiles that were created by Claycraft Potteries in Los Angeles.

Current Use 
Today, the theater is used for live performances and artists such as Loreena McKennitt, Nickel Creek, Ralph Stanley, Jerry Garcia and Eddie Vedder have performed there. It is owned by Alan Largent who had a restoration done in 2016.

References

External links 
Official La Paloma Theater website

Cinemas and movie theaters in California
History of San Diego County, California
Event venues established in 1928
Buildings and structures in San Diego County, California
Spanish Colonial Revival architecture in California
Encinitas, California